Rythm Syndicate is the full-length debut album released by the dance-rock band Rythm Syndicate, the group formed by songwriter-producers Carl Sturken and Evan Rogers.  It was released in 1991 on Impact, a subsidiary of MCA, and produced (and mostly written) by Sturken/Rogers.  Three singles were released: "P.A.S.S.I.O.N."  charted on the Billboard Hot 100, peaking at number 2, while the opening track "Hey Donna" peaked just outside the top 10, reaching number 13.  The last single "Blinded By Love" (which is part two of the "Anatomy of a Love Affair" suite) peaked at number 76.  Of the three singles released, only "P.A.S.S.I.O.N." charted in the UK, where it peaked at number 58.

In the liner notes, Rogers and Sturken thank Donny Osmond; they worked with him on his 1990 Capitol debut and its follow-up.  They refer to him as "the sacred soldier", in reference to two of the songs they worked on; "Sacred Emotion" and Soldier of Love".

Track listing
All songs written by Carl Sturken and Evan Rogers, except where noted.

Personnel

Rythm Syndicate
Evan Rogers: Vocal
Carl Sturken: Guitars, Keyboards
Mike McDonald: Guitars, Vocal Backing
Rob Mingrino: Sax, Vocal Backing
John "Noodle" Nevin: Bass, Vocal Backing
Kevin Cloud: Drums, Percussion, Vocal Backing

Additional musicians
Elisa Fiorillo: Additional Vocals (and "attitude") on "Anatomy of a Love Affair" Suite
Paul "St. Paul" Peterson: Guitars, Organ & Vocal Backing on "A Shoulder To Cry On"
Vincent Rogers: Trumpet on "Tearin' Down The Walls"

Production
Arranged & Produced By Carl Sturken & Evan Rogers
Recorded & Mixed By Darroll Gustamacho, except "Hey Donna" & "Love Is The Reason", which were mixed by Steve Peck
Additional Mix Engineers: Matt Noble, Al Hemberger & Ed Murphy; assisted by Mike Harlow & Fred Kelly
Mastered By Steve Hall at Futuredisc (Hollywood)
All Songs Published By Warner-Tamerlane Publishing Corp./Could Be Music/Bayjun Beat Music, except "A Shoulder To Cry On", published by Warner-Tamerlane Publishing Corp./Could Be Music/Bayjun Beat Music/EMI Music Publishing (Germany) GmbH and St. Paul Music Inc.

Reception
In a mixed (two and a half stars of a total five) review for allmusic, reviewer Ron Wynn claimed that the songs are "a series of excellent tracks, wonderfully arranged and produced," yet presented in a "faceless, generic fashion."  He also said that "They're absolutely great, as long as you don't pay attention to anything except the beat and the sound."

References
Liner Notes, Rythm Syndicate: Rythm Syndicate (1991, Impact/MCA)

1991 debut albums
Albums produced by Carl Sturken and Evan Rogers
MCA Records albums
Rythm Syndicate albums